El Siete (call sign LV 89 TV) is a television station broadcasting from Las Heras, province of Mendoza, Argentina. It carries programs from América TV and El Trece and is owned by Grupo América.

History

LV 89 began broadcasting on February 7, 1961, from the Edificio Gómez in the city center; it was the first station in Mendoza. Juan Gómez López, who had built the structure, had always planned for it to house a television station; however, he died in 1960, before it could be completed. The station was nationalized in 1973 during the interim presidency of Raúl Alberto Lastiri and returned to private control under the ownership of Jorge Estornell in 1983.

Grupo Uno, predecessor to Grupo América, acquired LV 89 and two other interior stations in 1997.

Several local programs are produced, including newscasts, Noticiero Siete, and the local morning show Hola Mendoza.

References

Television stations in Argentina
Television channels and stations established in 1961
1961 establishments in Argentina
Grupo América